Indicator organisms are used as a proxy to monitor conditions in a particular environment, ecosystem, area, habitat, or consumer product. Certain bacteria, fungi and helminth eggs are being used for various purposes.

Types

Indicator bacteria 

Certain bacteria can be used as indicator organisms in particular situations, such as when present in bodies of water. Indicator bacteria themselves may not be pathogenic but their presence in waste may indicate the presence of other pathogens. Similar to how there are various types of indicator organisms, there are also various types of indicator bacteria. The most common indicators are total coliforms, fecal coliforms, E. coli, and enterococci. The presence of bacteria commonly found in human feces, termed coliform bacteria (e.g. E. coli), in surface water is a common indicator of faecal contamination. The means by which pathogens found in fecal matter can enter recreational bodies of water include, but are not limited to, sewage, septic systems, urban runoff, coastal recreational waste, and livestock waste.

For this reason, sanitation programs often test water for the presence of these organisms to ensure that drinking water systems are not contaminated with feces. This testing can be done using several methods which generally involve taking samples of water, or passing large amounts of water through a filter to sample bacteria, then testing to see if bacteria from that water grow on selective media such as MacConkey agar. MacConkey agar will only allow the growth of gram-negative bacteria and the bacteria will grow differently according to how it metabolizes lactose or its lack of ability to metabolize it. Alternatively, the sample can be tested to see if it utilizes various nutrients in ways characteristic of coliform bacteria.

Coliform bacteria selected as indicators of faecal contamination must not persist in the environment for long periods of time following efflux from the intestine, and their presence must be closely correlated with contamination by other faecal organisms.  Indicator organisms need not be pathogenic.

Non-coliform bacteria, such as Streptococcus bovis and certain clostridia may also be used as an index of faecal contamination.

The presence of indicator bacteria is measured in a variety of ecosystems and sometimes alongside other measurements. In the Great Lakes, a study was conducted testing for both fecal indicator bacteria (FIB) concentrations and pathogen gene markers. The FIB measured in this study included fecal coliform bacteria, E. coli, and enterococci. FIB were collected via membrane filtration and serial dilution methods, producing samples which could be cultured and used to run PCR and amplify the pathogenic genes in question. Among the 22 sampling locations, 165 samples were analyzed and E. coli concentrations were found to range from less than 2 to 26,000 CFU/100mL, enterococci ranged from less than 2 to 31,000 CFU/100mL, and fecal coliform bacteria ranged from less than 2 to 950 CFU/100mL. 

Another example of indicator bacteria being measured for safety purposes is in Malibu, CA. The state of California requires that beaches with greater than 50,000 visitors a year be monitored for FIB. High FIB concentrations, exceeding what is considered acceptable by the EPA were observed in Malibu Lagoon and other Malibu beaches. Measurement of high levels of FIB leads to a search to determine what the source(s) is/are. Potential sources of FIB in the Malibu area include waste from sewage treatment systems, runoff from local developments, and wildlife waste. Common FIB were measured including enterococci which presented itself in levels as high as 242,000 MPN/100mL within onsite wastewater treatment systems. The measurement of FIB is widespread and used for the purpose of providing safe waters. 

In Texas, the occurrence and distribution of FIB, in particular fecal coliforms and E. coli, were measured in streams that receive discharge from the Dallas Fort Worth International Airport and the surrounding area. These streams receiving the waste are home to aquatic life, used for recreational purposes, and as fishing sites. Various standards exist in order to ensure the safety of all organisms present in the ecosystem, including humans. E. coli is used as an indicator of unsafe or below standard water quality for recreational use in Texas. The standards for E. coli levels that declare contact recreation unsafe are a geometric mean of over 126 cfu/100mL or over a fourth of the samples measuring levels greater than 394cfu/100mL. Various sites were tested, some found to exceed acceptable levels of E. coli and therefore did not support recreational use. This is yet another example of how testing for indicator bacteria is used to determine whether bodies of water are safe for various uses, particularly recreational use.

Indicator fungi 
Penicillium species, Aspergillus niger and Candida albicans are used in the pharmaceutical industry for microbial limit testing, bioburden assessment, method validation, antimicrobial challenge tests, and quality control testing. When used in this capacity, Penicillium and A. niger are compendial mold indicator organisms.

Molds such as Trichoderma, Exophiala, Stachybotrys, Aspergillus fumigatus, Aspergillus versicolor, Phialophora, Fusarium, Ulocladium and certain yeasts are used as indicators of indoor air quality.

Metagenomic techniques allow for the sequencing of whole populations of microorganisms in a single operation.  With metagenomic sequencing, it is possible to use the entire community of fungal organisms, or mycobiome in the soil or water of a given area as a biological indicator of anthropogenic activity, such as sewage overflow from an urban area or fertilizer and pesticide runoff from an agricultural one.

Composition of fungal communities has been found to be a good indicator of environmental properties like pH, altitude and water temperature. Chauvet used this approach to take ecosystem-wide measurements of these variables using a network of monitoring stations at 27 streams in Southwestern France.

Cudowski et al. sampled fungi in the water of the Augustow canal in eastern Poland. They took many standard measures of water quality -- temperature, oxygen saturation, pH, and dissolved nitrogen, organic carbon and sulfur levels. They identified species with microscopic methods and RFLP analysis. They found 38 fungal species, including 12 hyphomycetiae and 13 potential pathogens, belonging either to the dermatophytes or to relatives of C. albicans.  Cudowski et al. found that they could determine whether a sample of water had been taken from the natural (lake-like) or artificial part of the canal. They also found that the three major groups of fungi that they found, hyphomycetes, dermatophytes and Candida relatives, could predict many of their water quality measurements, which formed two clusters in a redundancy analysis.  

Bouffand et al. used Arbuscular Mycorhizzal Fungi (AMF), an asexual clade of fungi that form symbiotic relationships with plant root systems, as indicators to assess soil function and biodiversity in many sites across Europe.  They took soil samples in various climatic zones (atlantic, continental, mediterranean, alpine) and three land use regimes (arable, grassland, forestry), and sequenced the DNA of the fungi the soil contained. They found eight indicator species for soil pH: four that were only present when pH was less than 5, three for pH > 5 and one for pH > 7.  They found eight indicators of land use: two for forests, five for farm- and grassland, and one for both.  They also found one indicator fungus that was present when soil organic carbon was high, and another present when it was low.

Indicator helminth eggs 

The eggs from helminths (parasitic worms) are a commonly used indicator organism to assess the safety of sanitation and wastewater reuse systems (such schemes are also called reuse of human excreta). This is because they are the most resistant pathogens of all types of pathogens (pathogens can be viruses, bacteria, protozoa and helminths). It means they are relatively hard to destroy through conventional treatment methods. They can survive for 10–12 months in tropical climates. These eggs are also called ova in the literature.  

Helminth eggs that are found in wastewater and sludge stem from soil-transmitted helminths (STHs) which include Ascaris lumbricoides (Ascaris), Anclostoma duodenale and Necator americanus (hookworm), and Trichuris trichiura (whipworm). Ascaris and whipworm that are identified in reusable wastewater systems can cause certain diseases and complications if ingested by humans and pigs. Hookworms will plant and hatch their larvae into the soil where they grow until maturity. Once the hookworm eggs are fully developed, they infect organisms by crawling through the organism’s skin. 

The presence or absence of viable helminth eggs ("viable" meaning that a larva would be able to hatch from the egg) in a sample of dried fecal matter, compost or fecal sludge is often used to assess the efficiency of diverse wastewater and sludge treatment processes in terms of pathogen removal. In particular, the number of viable Ascaris eggs is often taken as an indicator for all helminth eggs in treatment processes as they are very common in many parts of the world and relatively easy to identify under the microscope. However, the exact inactivation characteristics may vary for different types of helminth eggs.
The technique used for testing depends on the type of sample. When the helminth ova are in sludge, processes such as alkaline-post stabilization, acid treatment, and anaerobic digestion are used to reduce the amount of helminth ova in areas where there is a large amount. These methods make it possible for helminth ova to be within the healthy requirements of ≤1 helminth ova per liter. Dehydration is used to inactivate helminth ova in fecal sludge. This type of inactivation occurs when feces is stored between 1-2 years, a high total solids content (>50-60%) is present, items such as leaves, lime, earth, etc. are added, and at a temperature of 30℃ or higher.

See also
Coliform bacteria
Coliform index
E. coli
Indicator species

References

Bacteria
Indicators